WJIL 1550 AM is a radio station licensed to Jacksonville, Illinois broadcasting a news/talk format. WJIL is owned by Sarah Shellhammer, through licensee Morgan County Media LLC.

References

External links
WJIL's official website

JIL
Companies based in Morgan County, Illinois
News and talk radio stations in the United States